Erected around 1920, the Luss War Memorial is located on Pier Road in Luss, Argyll and Bute, Scotland. It is dedicated to the citizens of the village who lost their lives while in military service during World War I and World War II. It is a Category C listed structure.

The memorial is set inside a whinstone wall recess with steps up to a cross with a Pictish sword in relief, set on octagonal base.

Detail

References 

Category C listed buildings in Argyll and Bute
Cenotaphs in the United Kingdom
British military memorials and cemeteries
1920 sculptures
Stone sculptures in the United Kingdom
Outdoor sculptures in Scotland
Monuments and memorials in Scotland
Buildings and structures in Luss
World War I memorials in Scotland
World War II memorials in Scotland
1920 establishments in Scotland